

Background 

Babur and his army were strangers to the people whom he had subdued in India and a mutual dislike soon manifested itself between his soldiers and the inhabitants of Agra his headquarters. The invasion was regarded as a temporary inundation that would speedily pass off. Every man in authority raised troops and put himself in a condition to act. Those who held delegated authority or Jagirs being generally Afghans were consequently hostile to the new state of things.  They soon came to an understanding among themselves and took measures for mutual cooperation.

Western Afghan Confederates and Allies

Hasan Khan of Mewat in the neighborhood of Agra was the grand instigator of the opposition which was supported by Nizam Khan in Bayana; Muhammad Zaitoon of Dholpur; Tatar Khan Sarang Khani in Gwalior; Hussein Khan Lohani in Raberi; Kutb Khan in Etawah; Alim Khan Jilal Khan Jighat in Kalpi; Kasim Sambhali in Sambhal and Marghoob a slave in Mahawan within 20 km of Agra. Indeed, all of these chiefs were immediately around Agra or close upon its borders. They looked for aid from Maharana Sangram Singh better known as Rana Sanga, the ruler of Mewar, who on his part laid claim to a great part of the right bank of the Yamuna River including Delhi. These Western Afghans wished to place Sultan Mahmud Lodi a brother of the late Sultan Ibrahim Lodi on the throne of Delhi and so to preserve the Afghan and the Lodi dynasty.

Siege 

Babur's first active operation in the field was to dispatch a force to the relief of Sambhal a district lying beyond the Ganges in what is now called Rohilkhand. It was held by Kasim Sambhali who had formerly shown himself hostile to Babur but was glad to solicit his aid when at this time besieged in his chief town by Malik Baban Jilwani. This powerful and active Pathan chief had joined Babur after he had passed Sirhind but subsequently left him under circumstances which are not clear, but he probably was not satisfied with his reception as Babur complains with the bitterness of his presumption and pretensions and of the rudeness and stupid forwardness of the Pathans in general. However that may be, Baban had withdrawn himself from Babur's camp had collected an army and now besieged Kasim in Sambhal which he had discovered was ill garrisoned. Kasim reduced to the last extremity applied to Babur for assistance. The Emperor dispatched Hindu Baig with a body of Turks-Mughals along with Sheikh Kuren and his Doab Turkishbunds to his succor.

Hindu Baig marched with all possible expedition till he reached the Ganges and while busily employed in conveying his other troops across that river sent on in advance a Mughal officer with a body of his countrymen. Though the party did not exceed 150 men, they rode forward till they reached the town and such was the superiority which the invaders from the north had acquired over the troops of the country, that the Mughals had no sooner got between the town and the besiegers than they resolutely turned and charged them, though already the alarm had been given and Baban had had time to draw out his force. The attack was so vigorous and probably the panic produced by the expected approach of the rest of the detachment so great that Baban's whole army was routed and dispersed, with several elephants taken and many slaughtered.

Aftermath 

Babur's success did not end here. The fortress of Raberi on the Yamuna was soon after abandoned by its garrison and occupied by his troops, and he sent detachments to besiege Etawah and Dholpur, two places of the greatest importance from their vicinity to Agra.  But these initial victories brought him in direct conflict with the Western and Eastern Afghan confederates at once. Babur then sent an army under his son Humayun who would put to flight the army of the Eastern confederates and take Jaunpur, Oudh, and Kalpi.

Meanwhile, the Western Afghan confederates were being gradually swallowed up by Rana Sanga in the guise of alliance and protection. This was increasingly posing a major threat to Babur. He was justly alarmed at the progress of Rana Sanga who was in active correspondence with Hasan Khan Mewati of Mewat, the chief of the Western Afghan confederacy, and had acknowledged as Mahmud Lodi as the Sultan of Delhi, the brother of the late Sultan Ibrahim Lodi whom the Western Afghans had proclaimed King after his brother's death. This would ultimately result in the confrontation known as the Battle of Khanwa.

See also
 Battle of Ghaghra

References

Further reading 
TURK AUR SAMBHAL by Mohd Usman, 2011.

TURK-ASIA,EUROPE,AFRICA by Mohd Usman Published by VANI PRAKASHAN, New Delhi, INDIA, 2011.

TURK AUR SAMBHAL by Mohd Usman, 2011.

Notes 

Sambhal
1526 in India
Sambhal